Edward Franklin Rector (September 28, 1916 – April 26, 2001) was a colonel in the United States Air Force, a fighter ace of World War II, and a member of the Flying Tigers.

Early years
Rector, a native of Marshall, North Carolina, graduated from Catawba College in 1938 and began his military career as a naval aviator. The unit was formed with the financial backing of the Chinese government to help defend the Burma Road and Chinese cities from Japanese attack before the United States entered World War II.

At war
On December 10, 1941 Rector was part of a 3 plane photo reconnaissance mission from Rangoon to Bangkok.  On December 20 when the Flying Tigers engaged in combat for the first time during a raid by Hanoi-based Japanese aircraft on the Chinese city of Kunming, Rector provided the American Volunteer Group with its first aerial victory and would later record the last in a long list of 23rd Fighter Group air-to-air kills. In May 1942, he played a critical role in locating and attacking Japanese military columns attempting a push into China at the Salween River Gorge. This allowed the Chinese time to blow up a key bridge across the river, and the Japanese subsequently retreated into Burma. Rector was credited with having destroyed 10.5 Japanese aircraft in aerial combat during the war.

Later years

Rector retired from the United States Air Force in 1962 as a colonel and had a second career in the aviation industry as a consultant in India, North Africa, and Europe. He died April 26, 2001, at Walter Reed Army Medical Center after suffering a heart attack and was buried at Arlington National Cemetery.

Awards and decorations

Notes

References

External links
 Biography on 76th Fighter Squadron web site
 AVG Victory Credits Including Ed Rector's 4.75 AVG air-to-air kills per Dr. Olynyk
 Colonel Edward F. Rector, USAF Historical Marker A memorial for Colonel Rector in his home town of Marshall, NC.

 Edward Franklin Rector at ArlingtonCemetery.net, an unofficial website

1916 births
2001 deaths
United States Army Air Forces pilots of World War II
American World War II flying aces
Aviators from North Carolina
Burials at Arlington National Cemetery
Flying Tigers
Recipients of the Silver Star
Recipients of the Distinguished Flying Cross (United States)
Recipients of the Distinguished Flying Cross (United Kingdom)
Recipients of the Legion of Merit
Recipients of the Air Medal
United States Air Force colonels
People from Marshall, North Carolina
Military personnel from North Carolina
United States Naval Aviators
American expatriates in Taiwan